Chalcosyrphus proxima is a species of hoverfly in the family Syrphidae.

Distribution
West Indies.

References

Eristalinae
Insects described in 1944
Diptera of South America
Taxa named by Frank Montgomery Hull